The 2023 Adelaide International 1 is a tennis tournament on the 2023 ATP Tour and 2023 WTA Tour. It is a combined ATP Tour 250 and WTA 500 tournament played on outdoor hard courts in Adelaide, South Australia, Australia. This is the fourth edition of the tournament for the women and the third edition for the men. The tournament will take place at the Memorial Drive Tennis Centre from 1–8 January 2023 and is followed a week later by the 2023 Adelaide International 2, a combined ATP Tour 250 and WTA 500 tournament, at the same venue. The qualifying rounds will be held on the 31st of December, 2022.

Champions

Men's singles 

  Novak Djokovic def.  Sebastian Korda, 6–7(8–10), 7–6(7–3), 6–4
 It was Djokovic's 1st title of the year and the 92nd of his career.

Women's singles 

  Aryna Sabalenka def.  Linda Nosková 6–3, 7–6(7–4)

Men's doubles 

  Lloyd Glasspool /  Harri Heliövaara def.  Jamie Murray /  Michael Venus, 6–3, 7–6(7–3)

Women's doubles

  Asia Muhammad /  Taylor Townsend def.  Storm Hunter /  Kateřina Siniaková, 6–2, 7–6(7–2)

Points & Prize money

Points distribution 

*per team

Prize money 

*per team

ATP singles main draw entrants

Seeds 

† Rankings are as of 26 December 2022

Other entrants 
The following players received wildcards into the singles main draw:
  Thanasi Kokkinakis
  Christopher O'Connell
  Jordan Thompson

The following player received entry using a protected ranking into the singles main draw:
  Kyle Edmund

The following players received entry from the qualifying draw:
  Rinky Hijikata
  Kwon Soon-woo
  Alexei Popyrin
  Roman Safiullin

Withdrawals 
  Corentin Moutet → replaced by  Richard Gasquet
  Brandon Nakashima → replaced by  Mikael Ymer

ATP doubles main draw entrants

Seeds

† Rankings are as of 26 December 2022

Other entrants
The following pairs received wildcards into the doubles main draw:
  James Duckworth /  Alexei Popyrin 
  John Millman /  Edward Winter

The following pairs received entry as alternates:
  Taro Daniel /  Yoshihito Nishioka
  Quentin Halys /  Constant Lestienne

Withdrawals
  Nikola Ćaćić /  Miomir Kecmanović → replaced by  Taro Daniel /  Yoshihito Nishioka
  Ivan Dodig /  Austin Krajicek → replaced by  Quentin Halys /  Constant Lestienne
  Jack Draper /  Jannik Sinner → replaced by  Jannik Sinner /  Lorenzo Sonego
  Matthew Ebden /  Nicolas Mahut → replaced by  Matthew Ebden /  Aisam-ul-Haq Qureshi
  Sebastian Korda /  Brandon Nakashima → replaced by  Sebastian Korda /  Denis Shapovalov

WTA singles main draw entrants

Seeds 

† Rankings are as of 26 December 2022

Other entrants 
The following players received wildcard entry into the singles main draw:
  Jaimee Fourlis
  Priscilla Hon
  Garbiñe Muguruza 

The following players received entry using a protected ranking into the singles main draw:
  Bianca Andreescu
  Markéta Vondroušová

The following players received entry from the qualifying draw:
  Viktorija Golubic
  Anhelina Kalinina
  Marta Kostyuk
  Claire Liu
  Linda Nosková
  Shelby Rogers

WTA doubles main draw entrants

Seeds

† Rankings are as of 26 December 2022

Other entrants
The following pair received a wildcard into the doubles main draw:
  Kimberly Birrell /  Priscilla Hon

Withdrawals
  Anna Danilina /  Sania Mirza → replaced by  Anna Danilina /  Anna Kalinskaya

References

External links 
 

2023
2023 ATP Tour
2023 WTA Tour
Adel
January 2023 sports events in Australia